The 1911–12 Scottish Districts season is a record of all the rugby union matches for Scotland's district teams.

History

Edinburgh District beat Glasgow District in the Inter-City match 

Blues beat Whites in a trial match.

North District played Midlands District on 4 November 1911.

Results

Inter-City

Glasgow District:

Edinburgh District:

Other Scottish matches

North Reds: Cheyne (Aberdeen University), McAndrew (Gordonians), Saunders (Aberdeen University), Hay (Aberdeen University), R. Ledingham (Aberdeen GSFP), A. Ledingham (Queen's Cross), A. M. Johnston (Aberdeen GSFP), Mulligan (Aberdeen University), Hogg (Aberdeen University), Cameron (Aberdeen University), Simpson (Aberdeen GSFP), G. Ledingham (Aberdeen GSFP), Snowie (Queen's Cross), R. Johnston (Queen's Cross), Macintosh (Queen's Cross)

North Colours: Stronach (Aberdeen University), Wilkinson (Queen's Cross), D. Leith (Aberdeen GSFP), Duffus (Aberdeen GSFP), Gillespie (Aberdeenshire), Macintosh (Queen's Cross), Whamond (Aberdeen University), Hodson (Aberdeenshire), Gilbert (Aberdeenshire), Nichol (Queen's Cross), Morgan (Queen's Cross), Grant (Gordonians), Ross (Aberdeen GSFP), G. Leith (Aberdeen GSFP), Clark (Aberdeen University)

South of Scotland District: 

North of Scotland District: 

Combined Scottish Districts: 

Anglo-Scots:

Trial matches

Blues Trial: 

Whites Trial:

English matches

No other District matches played.

International matches

No touring matches this season.

References

1911–12 in Scottish rugby union
Scottish Districts seasons